The World of the Partridge Family is a greatest hits compilation album by The Partridge Family released in April 1974. This was their only two-record set as well as their last release on the Bell label, featuring 20 songs from the previous albums (except Christmas Card and Crossword Puzzle), including all their charted hits.  

Shortly after this release, which did not chart, Bell Records was sold and renamed Arista.  The album was renumbered as Arista 4021, but no new copies were printed.   Existing copies were merely shipped under the new Arista code number.  Only albums released in 1974 were renumbered; likewise, David Cassidy solo LP's were also renumbered.

Track listing
All tracks in this compilation were featured on the TV show

Production

Wes Farrell – Producer
Robert L. Heimall – Art Direction
Richard Mantel – Design
Gene Trindle – Photography
Titles formerly on Bell 6050, 6059, 6064, 1107, 1111 and 1137.

Track information and credits adapted from the album's liner notes.

References

The Partridge Family albums
1974 compilation albums
Bell Records compilation albums
Albums produced by Wes Farrell